Paulo Duarte (born 14 December 1966) is a Portuguese weightlifter. He competed in the men's lightweight event at the 1988 Summer Olympics.

References

1966 births
Living people
Portuguese male weightlifters
Olympic weightlifters of Portugal
Weightlifters at the 1988 Summer Olympics
Place of birth missing (living people)